Allan Tarsis Munaaba (born 19 April  1989) is a Ugandan retired  football player who  played for Uganda Revenue Authority SC  in the Ugandan Premier League as a left defender. Currently he serves as the Uganda Revenue Authority SC Chief Executive Officer since September 2021.

Club career
Munaaba started playing football in Jinja Municipal Council F.C. in 2005, SC Villa and he last played in Uganda Revenue Authority SC. He joined Uganda Revenue Authority SC in 2008 and made his debut against Young Africans FC in the Cecafa Cup 2008, Uganda Revenue Authority SC won 2-0 whereby Allan made an assist for the second goal. He scored his first goal for Uganda Revenue Authority SC against Sharing F.C at Nakivubo in 2009. Allan was a squad member which played in the CAF Confederation Cup 2015 and featured in all the matches. Allan is also the captain of Uganda Revenue Authority SC. In June 2020, he retired from football. In September 2021, he was appointed as the new Uganda Revenue Authority SC Chief Executive Officer replacing Henry Mayeku.

Lifestyle
In 2012, Munaaba graduated with a Bachelor of Business in Marketing from Makerere University.

Honors
Uganda Revenue Authority SC
1st  Runners  Tusker cup (1): 2008
Ugandan Premier League: 2
 2008–09
 2010–11
FUFA Super Cup: 2
 2010, 2013
 Ugandan Cup: 2
2011-2012, 2013-2014
Mapinduzi cup: 1
2016

References

External links
bigwhalesports.com
Allan Munaaba - Soccer player profile & career statistics - Global Sports Archive
Former URA defender handed administrative role at the club | Swift Sports Uganda
Allan Munaaba makes a striking return to URA FC.
Allan Munaaba at playmakerstats.com (English version of ogol.com.br)
urafc.co.ug

Living people
Association football defenders
Ugandan footballers
Makerere University alumni
Uganda international footballers
1989 births